Patrick Drolet is a Canadian film and television actor. His credits include the films Father and Guns (De père en flic), The Child Prodigy (L'Enfant prodige), All That You Possess (Tout ce que tu possèdes), Honey, I'm in Love (Le Grand départ), The Genius of Crime (Le Génie du crime) and The Novena (La neuvaine), and the television series Les Invincibles, Mémoires vives, Les Bougon: C'est aussi ça la vie, Trauma and Happily Married (C'est comme ça que je t'aime).

He was nominated for Best Supporting Actor at the 2010 Genie Awards for his performance in De père en flic, and for Best Actor at the 1st Canadian Screen Awards for his performance in Tout ce que tu possèdes.

Filmography

Film

Television

References

External links

Year of birth missing (living people)
Living people
Canadian male film actors
Canadian male television actors
Male actors from Quebec
National Theatre School of Canada alumni